Henry Leavenworth (December 10, 1783 – July 21, 1834) was an American soldier active in the War of 1812 and early military expeditions against the Plains Indians. He established Fort Leavenworth in Kansas, and named after him is the city of Leavenworth, Kansas, Leavenworth County, Kansas, and the Leavenworth Penitentiary.

Early life and education
He was born at New Haven, Connecticut, a son of Col. Jesse and Catharine (Conklin) Leavenworth. Soon after his birth his parents became alienated and his father moved with the children to Danville, Vermont, where he was educated. He then read law with General Erastus Root of Delhi, New York; and upon being admitted to the bar formed a partnership with his preceptor which lasted until 1812.

Military career

War of 1812
Leavenworth was commissioned as a captain in the 25th U. S. Infantry in April 1812, shortly before the outbreak of the War of 1812. In August 1813 he was promoted to major of the 9th Infantry.  He was wounded at the Battle of Niagara on July 25, 1814, and the following November was brevetted to the rank of colonel.

Post war
After the war, he then served in the New York State Assembly, in 1816, and then he went to Prairie du Chien as Indian agent, and on February 10, 1818, was made lieutenant-colonel of the Fifth U. S. Infantry. In 1820 he began constructing Fort St. Anthony from the Cantonment New Hope stockade.

Later career
In 1823, he led U.S. Army troops in the Arikara War, the first U.S. military expedition against a Great Plains Indian nation. While on duty in the West he built several military posts, one of which was Fort Leavenworth, Kansas, established May 8, 1827 as Cantonment Leavenworth, now one of the leading military establishments of the country. In 1825 he was made brigadier-general by brevet.

In 1834 he commanded the United States Regiment of Dragoons during its expedition from Fort Gibson, Indian Territory to the Wichita Mountains.  The artist George Catlin was also in this expedition, and wrote of Leavenworth's death.  They hoped to meet and open formal relations among the United States and the Comanche, Kiowa, and Wichita peoples.

Death

General Leavenworth died in the Cross Timbers in the Indian Territory, on land near modern Kingston, Oklahoma, on July 21, 1834, of either sickness or an accident while buffalo-hunting; while leading an expedition against the Pawnee and Comanche. His regiment erected a monument at Cross Timbers; he was first buried in Delhi, with his remains later reinterred at Fort Leavenworth National Cemetery.

Marriages
He was married three times, first to Elizabeth Eunice Morrison, with whom he had two children, and divorced, then to Electa Knapp, who died within the year, then to Harriet Lovejoy, with whom he had another child.  Lake Harriet in Minneapolis is named for Harriet Lovejoy.

His son Jesse Henry Leavenworth was also a military careerist.

Legacy
In addition to Fort Leavenworth, Kansas, Leavenworth County, Kansas, the Leavenworth Penitentiary, Henry Leavenworth Elementary School, and Leavenworth Street in Omaha are named after him.  The United States Disciplinary Barracks (USDB) at Fort Leavenworth is commonly called "Leavenworth".

Dates of rank
Captain, 25th Infantry - 25 April 1812
Major, 9th Infantry - 15 August 1813
Brevet Lieutenant Colonel - 5 July 1814
Brevet Colonel - 25 July 1814
Major, 2nd Infantry - 17 May 1815
Lieutenant Colonel, 5th Infantry - 10 February 1818
Lieutenant Colonel, 6th Infantry - 1 October 1821
Brevet Brigadier General - 25 July 1824
Colonel, 3rd Infantry - 16 December 1825

See also
 First Dragoon Expedition - Describes both time and place of General Leavenworth's death
 Fort Snelling, Minnesota - Supported surveying fur trading routes and watersheds earlier in his career

References

External links
 1st Dragoons Living history

1783 births
1834 deaths
Members of the New York State Assembly
People from Delhi, New York
Military personnel from New Haven, Connecticut
Pre-statehood history of Kansas
Pre-statehood history of Minnesota
19th-century American politicians
Politicians from New Haven, Connecticut